Frankie Luvu (born September 19, 1996) is an American football linebacker for the Carolina Panthers of the National Football League (NFL). He played college football at Washington State. Luvu was signed by the New York Jets as an undrafted free agent in 2018.

Professional career

New York Jets
Luvu was signed by the New York Jets as an undrafted free agent on May 4, 2018. He was waived on September 1, 2018 and was signed to the practice squad the next day. He was promoted to the active roster on September 8, 2018.

On October 14, 2019, Luvu was waived by the Jets and re-signed to the practice squad. He was promoted to the active roster on November 1, 2019.

Luvu re-signed with the Jets on April 23, 2020. He was placed on injured reserve on October 20, 2020 with a groin injury. He was activated on November 21, 2020.

Carolina Panthers
Luvu signed with the Carolina Panthers on March 23, 2021. He entered the season as a backup linebacker and core special teamer. He played in 16 games with four starts, recording 43 tackles, 1.5 sacks, one forced fumble, three fumble recoveries and a blocked punt.

On February 17, 2022, Luvu signed a two-year contract extension with the Panthers.

On October 2, 2022, Luvu recorded his first career interception and touchdown against the Arizona Cardinals.

Personal life 
Frankie Luvu is of Fijian descent through his father and of Samoan descent through his mother.

References

External links
New York Jets bio

1996 births
Living people
American football linebackers
American people of Fijian descent
Fijian players of American football
New York Jets players
Players of American football from American Samoa
Washington State Cougars football players
People from Western District, American Samoa
Carolina Panthers players